is a passenger railway station located in the city of Tsurugashima, Saitama, Japan, operated by the private railway operator Tōbu Railway.

Lines
Rapid Express, Express, Semi express, and Local services stop at this station.

Station layout
The station consists of two side platforms serving two tracks, with an elevated station building above the platforms.

Platforms

History
The station opened on 10 April 1932.

From 17 March 2012, station numbering was introduced on the Tōbu Tōjō Line, with Tsurugashima Station becoming "TJ-24".

From March 2023, Tsurugashima Station became an Rapid Express service stop following the abolishment of the Rapid (快速, Kaisoku) services and reorganization of the Tōbu Tōjō Line services.

Passenger statistics
In fiscal 2019, the station was used by an average of 33,039 passengers daily.  The passenger figures for previous years are as shown below.

Surrounding area
Tsurugashima Station lies on the boundary between the two cities of Kawagoe and Tsurugashima.
 Toyo University Kawagoe Campus

See also
 List of railway stations in Japan

References

External links

  

Tobu Tojo Main Line
Stations of Tobu Railway
Railway stations in Saitama Prefecture
Railway stations in Japan opened in 1932
Tsurugashima, Saitama